The 4th Lumières Awards ceremony, presented by the Académie des Lumières, was held on 16 January 1999. The ceremony was chaired by Jean Reno. The Dreamlife of Angels won three awards including Best Film, Best Director and Best Actress.

Winners

See also
 24th César Awards

References

External links
 
 
 4th Lumières Awards at AlloCiné

Lumières Awards
Lumières
Lumières